Parascorpaena bandanensis, or the Banda scorpionfish is a species of marine ray-finned fish belonging to the family Scorpaenidae, the scorpionfishes. They are native to the East Indies.

Description 
Banda scorpionfish have twelve dorsal spines, nine to ten dorsal soft rays, three anal spines, and five anal soft rays. Their maximum size is about 10.0 cm.

Behavior 
Banda scorpionfish primarily dwell in reefs, as well as shallow rubbled estuaries.

IUCN Status 
The banda scorpionfish has not yet been evaluated by the IUCN and as such lacks an official IUCN status. Based on the conservation status of other known species of scorpionfish it is unlikely that the species is at all threatened. Despite this, reports from the 19th and 20th centuries state the existence of Banda scorpionfish in the waters around Singapore, however, studies conducted in 2011 and 2020 have shown a lack of data suggesting continued habitation. This may suggest a decline in population over the last century, though it is unlikely that the species is facing any significant risk.

References 

bandanensis
Taxa named by Pieter Bleeker
Fish described in 1851
Fish of Singapore